Máximo González didn't want to defend his 2008 title.
Fabio Fognini became the new champion. He won 6–7(5–7), 7–6(7–2), 6–0, against Cristian Villagrán.

Seeds

Draw

Final four

Top half

Bottom half

References
 Main Draw
 Qualifying Draw

Carisap Tennis Cup - Singles
ATP Challenger San Benedetto